Sir James Robert Dickson,   (30 November 183210 January 1901) was an Australian politician and businessman, the 13th Premier of Queensland and a member of the first federal ministry.

Early life
Dickson was born on 30 November 1832 in Plymouth, Devon, England. He was the only son of Mary Maria (née Palmer) and James Dickson. He was educated in Scotland at the High School of Glasgow, and subsequently worked as a junior clerk at the City of Glasgow Bank. Dickson arrived in Australia in 1854 during the Victorian gold rush. He initially worked for the Bank of Australasia and then for Rae, Dickson & Co., his cousin's merchant firm. He moved to the Colony of Queensland in 1862, working for an estate agent for a period and then establishing himself as an auctioneer and land agent. He built Toorak House, a villa overlooking the Brisbane River.

Colonial politics

Dickson was elected as a member of the Legislative Assembly of Queensland for Enoggera in 1873. He was made Secretary for Public Works and Mines in 1876 under Arthur Macalister, and was Treasurer 1876–79. In the absence of Sir Samuel Griffith he was briefly Opposition Leader, and was Treasurer again 1883–87 after Griffith became Premier. He lost his seat in 1888 but was again elected for Bulimba in 1892, supporting the importation of labourers from the South Pacific to work on the Queensland canefields.

In the so-called Continuous Ministry of the late 1890s, Dickson attained the positions of Secretary for Railways in 1897, Postmaster-General and Home Secretary 1898–99. In September 1898, after the death of Thomas Byrnes he was made Premier. The Continuous Ministry by this stage was falling apart, and Dickson had only a brief period in office before Anderson Dawson gained the support of the Legislative Assembly to become the leader of the world's first Labour Party government.  The Ministerialists regrouped a week later to vote Dawson out of office. Dickson lacked support to become Premier again, and that position instead went to Robert Philp, in whose government Dickson was Chief Secretary.

Federal politics and death

Dickson was a leading supporter of federation in Queensland and was mainly responsible for winning a "yes" vote in the Queensland referendum on the proposed Constitution of Australia in 1900. As a result, Dickson was appointed Minister for Defence in the first federal ministry under Edmund Barton on 1 January 1901. He was intending to stand for election to the first Federal Parliament, but on 10 January he died after being taken ill at the Commonwealth's inaugural ceremonies in Sydney on 1 January.  He was the first federal Minister to die in office.

He was accorded a state funeral; it proceeded from Toorak, his residence at Hamilton, to the All Saints Anglican Church. After a short service it moved on to the Nundah Cemetery.

Honours

He was elected a Fellow of the Royal Geographical Society in November 1891. Only nine days before he died, Dickson was appointed a Knight Commander of the Order of St Michael and St George in the New Years Honours List 1 January 1901, in recognition of services in connection with the Federation of Australian Colonies and the establishment of the Commonwealth of Australia. The federal electoral division of Dickson  in Queensland, and the Canberra suburb of Dickson are named after him.

References

External links

1832 births
1901 deaths
Protectionist Party politicians
People from Plymouth, Devon
English emigrants to colonial Australia
Premiers of Queensland
Members of the Cabinet of Australia
Australian federationists
Australian Knights Commander of the Order of St Michael and St George
Australian politicians awarded knighthoods
Treasurers of Queensland
Australian auctioneers
Burials at Nundah Cemetery
Defence ministers of Australia
19th-century Australian politicians
Members of the Queensland Legislative Assembly
Fellows of the Royal Geographical Society
19th-century Australian businesspeople
People educated at the High School of Glasgow